As of 2022, Jehovah's Witnesses reported a monthly average membership of approximately 8.5 million actively involved in preaching, with a peak of about 8.7 million. Jehovah's Witnesses have an active presence in most countries, though they do not form a large part of the population of any country.

To be counted as an active member, an individual must be a publisher, and report some amount of time preaching to non-members, normally at least an hour per month. Under certain circumstances, such as chronic and debilitating illness, members may report increments of 15 minutes. Jehovah's Witnesses' preaching activity is self-reported, and members are directed to submit a 'Field Service Report' each month. Baptized members who fail to submit a report every month are termed 'irregular'. Those who do not submit a report for six continuous months are termed 'inactive'.

Membership activity 
For 2022, about 1.5 billion hours of preaching were reported and nearly 145,600 new members were baptized. Nearly 5.7 million home Bible studies with Jehovah's Witnesses were reported, including Bible studies conducted by Witness parents with their children.

Jehovah's Witnesses' official statistics only count as members those who submit reports for preaching activity, usually resulting in lower membership numbers than those found by external surveys. For example, Jehovah's Witnesses report approximately 1.2 million active publishers in the United States, whereas the Pew Research Center reported that Jehovah's Witnesses make up 0.8% of the US population (approximately 2.5 million). Their official statistics indicate membership according to various territories—which they refer to as "lands"—many of which are not independent countries.

According to official statistics, about 19.7 million people worldwide attended Jehovah's Witnesses' 2022 observance of the Memorial of Christ's death (also termed the Lord's Evening Meal). Of those, more than 21,000 people partook of the memorial emblems of unleavened bread and wine. Those who partake profess to be of the 144,000 "anointed" and hope to go to heaven, based on their interpretation of Revelation 14:1.

Congregations are generally organized geographically, and members are directed to attend the Kingdom Hall to which their neighborhood has been assigned, resulting in an ethnic mix generally representative of local population, though congregations based on language and ethnicity have also been formed.

2022 statistics

See also 
 Jehovah's Witnesses by country

References

External links
Interactive map showing JW adherents in individual lands in service years 2002-2008 
Jehovah's Witnesses official website
How Many of Jehovah’s Witnesses Are There Worldwide?

Jehovah's Witnesses
Religious demographics